Admiral Howard may refer to:

Charles Howard, 1st Earl of Nottingham (1536–1624), English Lord High Admiral
Edward Howard (admiral) (1476/1477–1513), English Lord High Admiral
Hugh W. Howard (fl. 1990s–2020s), U.S. Navy rear admiral 
John Howard, 1st Duke of Norfolk (c. 1425–1485), English Lord Admiral
Michelle Howard (born 1960), U.S. Navy admiral
Thomas Howard, 1st Earl of Suffolk (1561–1626), English Lord Admiral
Thomas Howard, 3rd Duke of Norfolk (1473–1554), English Lord Admiral
Thomas B. Howard (1854–1920), U.S. Navy admiral
William Howard, 1st Baron Howard of Effingham (c. 1510–1573), English Lord Admiral